Edgehill Church at Spuyten Duyvil is a former United Church of Christ parish church located at 2550 Independence Avenue in the Spuyten Duyvil neighborhood of The Bronx, New York City. Its congregation was founded in 1869 as the mission chapel affiliated with the Riverdale Presbyterian Church, serving the workers at the nearby Johnson Iron Foundry. The church, described by the AIA Guide to New York City as a "picturesque eclectic sanctuary", was designed by architect Francis Kimball in a mixture of styles – Romanesque Revival, Tudor Revival and Shingle style – and was built from 1888–1889. It features stained glass windows designed by Louis Comfort Tiffany.

By 1977, the church's congregation had fallen dramatically. Plans were announced to close the church and convert it into a community center, the pastoral leadership was assumed by the Rev. Dr. William A. Tieck, a retired Methodist, who led the congregation until his death in 1997.

The church was designated a New York City landmark in 1980 under the name "Riverdale Presbyterian Chapel", and was added to the National Register of Historic Places on 1982.

In 2022, Edgehill Church was turned over to the Kingsbridge Historical Society, the oldest historical society in The Bronx.

See also
List of New York City Landmarks
National Register of Historic Places listings in Bronx County, New York
John Jay McKelvey Sr., Attorney, Founder of Harvard Law Review, Edgehill Church, Founder, Incorporator, Trustee.

References 
Notes

Further reading
Harmalyn, Gary D. and Kornfeld, Robert. Landmarks of the Bronx Bronx County Historical Society, 1989.

External links 
 "A brief history of Edgehill Church at Spuyten Duyvil" on Forgotten New York

United Church of Christ churches in New York City
Properties of religious function on the National Register of Historic Places in the Bronx
Churches in the Bronx
Queen Anne architecture in New York City
Churches completed in 1888
New York City Designated Landmarks in the Bronx
19th-century United Church of Christ church buildings
Spuyten Duyvil, Bronx